Alpha-1,2-mannosyltransferase ALG9 is an enzyme that in humans is encoded by the ALG9 gene.

References

Further reading

External links
  GeneReviews/NCBI/NIH/UW entry on Congenital Disorders of Glycosylation Overview